Wöllstein is a Verbandsgemeinde ("collective municipality") in the district Alzey-Worms, Rhineland-Palatinate, Germany. The seat of the Verbandsgemeinde is in Wöllstein.

The Verbandsgemeinde Wöllstein consists of the following Ortsgemeinden ("local municipalities"):

 Eckelsheim
 Gau-Bickelheim
 Gumbsheim
 Siefersheim
 Stein-Bockenheim
 Wendelsheim
 Wöllstein
 Wonsheim

Verbandsgemeinde in Rhineland-Palatinate